Phil Hoy (born  in Luton, England), is a rugby union player currently without a club after playing for Northampton Saints in the Guinness Premiership. He plays as a lock. He was released by Northampton Saints at the end of the 2008-09 season.

References

External links
Northampton Saints profile

1987 births
Living people
English rugby union players
Northampton Saints players
Rugby union players from Luton